Hawadi River is a river of Ethiopia.

Awash River
Rivers of Ethiopia